This is a list of Armies of the countries of the World.

List of armies by country

See also 
 List of militaries by country
 List of navies
 List of air forces
 List of space forces
 List of marines and naval infantry forces 
 List of gendarmeries
 List of military special forces units
 list of national guards, home guards and militias

Notes

References

 
 
.Armies by country